Conversazione in Sicilia is a novel by the Italian author Elio Vittorini. It originally appeared in serial form in the literary magazine Letteratura in 1938–1939, and was first published in book form under the title Nome e Lagrime in 1941. The story concerns Silvestro Ferrauto and his return to Sicily after a long absence. Major themes of the work are detachment, poverty, exploitation and marital fidelity and respect.

Conversazione in Sicilia literally translates to English as Conversation in Sicily; English translations have appeared under that title and a variety of other titles, including In Sicily and Conversations in Sicily. The first US edition contains a foreword by Ernest Hemingway, reprinted in several later editions.

Plot summary
Silvestro Ferrauto is a Sicilian working as a typesetter in Milan, who beset by strange feelings of hopelessness, decides to visit Sicily after receiving a letter from his father which reveals that the father has abandoned Ferrauto's mother. Ferrauto has not visited Sicily since leaving at the age of 15 and ends up on the train to Sicily apparently without conscious thought. Ferrauto then has various conversations with a number of Sicilians on the way to, and in, Sicily. His return to Sicily and his new understanding of his mother from an adult point of view seems to calm his hopelessness. In a drunken state he seems to have a conversation with his dead brother, or at the age, he was when he was alive. The novel closes with his father sobbing in the kitchen whilst the mother scrubs his feet.

Characters
 Silvestro Ferrauto - the protagonist
 The Father - appears in the end while the mother is washing his feet
 The Wife - never appears in person
 Sicilian orange pickers - first conversation is with a Sicilian labourer
 "With Mustache" - a Sicilian policeman on the train, a state functionary
 "Without Mustache" - a Sicilian policeman on the train, a state functionary
 The Big Lombard - a Sicilian on the train
 Concezione Ferrauto - the mother
 Grandpa - the father of the mother, deceased
 Calogero - the Knife Grinder
 Ezechiele - the saddlemaker
 Porfirio - the draper
 Colombo - the vintner
 Liborio - the brother, deceased

Literary significance and criticism
The novel is usually interpreted by critics as either a criticism of fascist Italy, disguised by the use of allegoric figures and by the adoption of a non-realistic style, or as the chronicle of a dream-like voyage. Themes revolving around social injustice, which will be central in Vittorini's future work, are already present.

The protagonist and author share many of the same experiences - growing up in a railway family, travelling widely by rail around Sicily and Italy, working in northern Italy as a typesetter, and illness.

Adaptation
The novel serves as the basis for Jean-Marie Straub and Danièle Huillet's film Sicilia!.

Footnotes

Conversations in Sicily, Elio Vittorini, translated by Alane Salierno Mason

1938 novels
20th-century Italian novels
Novels set in Sicily
Novels first published in serial form
Canongate Books books